Nicola Antonio Manfroce  (20 February 1791, in Palmi – 9 July 1813, in Naples) was an Italian composer. His first work was a cantata for Napoleon's birthday, which was performed at the Neapolitan court on 15 August 1809.

References

1791 births
1813 deaths
19th-century classical composers
Italian Romantic composers
Italian classical composers
Italian male classical composers
Italian opera composers
Male opera composers
People from Palmi
19th-century Italian male musicians